Loop Independent School District is a public school district based in the community of Loop, Texas (USA).

Located in Gaines County, a small portion of the district extends into Terry County.

Loop ISD has one school that serves students in grades pre-kindergarten through twelve.

Academic achievement
In 2010, the school district was rated "exemplary" by the Texas Education Agency.

Special programs

Athletics
Loop High School plays six-man football.

Band
Loop High School is the smallest school in Texas that has a band program.

Notable alumni 

 David D. Davis, punter for Texas A&M football

See also

List of school districts in Texas

References

External links
Loop ISD

School districts in Gaines County, Texas
School districts in Terry County, Texas